Marta Hernández, of Mexico was an amateur tennis player, active during the 1950s and 1960s.

Career
In 1956 she and compatriot Yola Ramírez were runner-ups in the doubles event at the U.S. Women's Clay Court Championships, losing the final in straight sets to Shirley Fry and Dorothy Knode.
In 1959, Hernández reached the singles finals at the Canadian Open, before falling to Australian Marie Martin. She also reached the doubles final in Canada that year (with partner Marilyn Montgomery).

In 1958, at the Cincinnati Masters, she won the doubles title (with Montgomery) and reached the singles final, only to fall to 17-year-old American Gwyn Thomas.

References

Mexican female tennis players
Living people
Year of birth missing (living people)